Hamilton High School is a public high school located in Hamilton, Texas, United States and classified as a 3A school by the University Interscholastic League (UIL).  It is part of the Hamilton Independent School District located in central Hamilton County.  In 2015, the school was rated "Met Standard" by the Texas Education Agency.

Athletics
The Hamilton Bulldogs compete in these sports - 

Baseball
Basketball
Cross Country
Football
Golf
Powerlifting
Softball
Tennis
Track and Field
Volleyball

State titles
Girls Basketball - 
1952 (1A), 1998 (2A)
Girls Cross Country - 
1992 (2A), 1993 (2A), 1994 (2A), 1995 (2A), 1996 (2A), 2015 (2A), 2022 (2A)
Boys Golf - 
1997 (2A), 1998 (2A), 1999 (2A)
Girls Golf - 
1998 (2A), 1999 (2A), 2000 (2A), 2001 (2A)

State finalists 
Girls Basketball - 
1993 (2A)
UIL Lone Star Cup Champions 
1998 (2A)

Band
UIL Marching Band Sweepstakes Champion - 
1980(1A)

References

External links
Hamilton ISD

Public high schools in Texas